Route 23 may refer to:

 Route 23 (MTA Maryland), a bus route in Baltimore, Maryland and its suburbs
 London Buses route 23, a bus route in London, UK
 SEPTA Route 23, bus route and former streetcar line in Philadelphia.

See also 
 List of highways numbered 23

23